Essen is a German surname. Notable people with the surname include:

August Franz Essen (1720–1792), Saxonian diplomat
Hans Henric von Essen (1755–1824), Swedish officer, courtier and statesman
Louis Essen (1908–1997), English physicist
Nikolai Essen (1860–1915), Russian naval commander and admiral
Siri von Essen (1850–1912), Swedish/Finnish actress, married to August von Strindberg 1877–91
Thomas Von Essen (born 1954), commissioner of the New York City Fire Department

German-language surnames